Alan James William Bell (born 14 November 1937) is a British television producer and director. He was born in Battersea, London.

He has produced or directed many BBC series since the early 1970s, most notably Last of the Summer Wine, Ripping Yarns and the TV adaptation of The Hitchhiker's Guide to the Galaxy. He was also assigned to re-edit and improve Ronnie Barker's short 1982 film, By the Sea. Other comedy shows include There's a Lot of it About, The Hello Goodbye Man, The Clairvoyant, Wyatt's Watchdogs, Dogfood Dan and the Carmarthen Cowboy and Split Ends.

In 1999 Bell directed the TV film Lost for Words. The film was adapted from the autobiographical book of the same title by Deric Longden. It was a sequel to Longden's earlier autobiographical film Wide-Eyed and Legless (known as  The Wedding Gift in the USA). It dealt with Deric's mother Annie (Thora Hird), her decline into dementia and how Deric (Pete Postlethwaite) and his wife, partially-sighted novelist Aileen Armitage (Penny Downie) coped with this. For her performance, Hird won the 2000 BAFTA for Best Actress, the 1999 RTS Award for Best Actor - Female, as well as the 1999 National Television Award for Most Popular Actress. The film also won a 1999 Peabody Award and the 1999 International Emmy for Best Drama.

Bell produced and directed 250 episodes of Last of the Summer Wine from 1981 until 2010 when the series ended.

References

External links

Living people
1937 births
BBC television producers
British television directors